Mickey's Mellerdrammer is a 1933  American animated short film produced by Walt Disney Productions and released by United Artists. The title is a corruption of "melodrama", thought to harken back to the earliest minstrel shows, as a film short based on Harriet Beecher Stowe's 1852 anti-slavery novel Uncle Tom's Cabin and stars Mickey Mouse and his friends who stage their own production of the novel. It was the 54th Mickey Mouse short film, and the fourth of that year.

The cartoon shows Mickey Mouse and some of the other characters dressed in blackface with exaggerated lips; bushy, white sidewhiskers made out of cotton; and his usual white gloves.

Plot

In Mickey's Mellerdrammer, Mickey Mouse, Minnie Mouse, Goofy (known then as Dippy Dawg), Horace Horsecollar, and others present their own low budget light-hearted rendition of the 19th century Tom Shows for a crowd in a barn converted into a theater for the occasion.

Horace Horsecollar plays the white slave owner Simon Legree. Minnie plays the young white girl, Eva. Mickey plays old Uncle Tom with cotton around his ears and chin, and the young slave girl Topsy. Clarabelle Cow plays the slave woman Eliza. Goofy plays the production stage hand.

The cartoon opens with Mickey and Clarabelle Cow in their dressing rooms applying blackface makeup for their roles (Mickey originally used a small dynamite to black up his face). The cartoon is much more focused on the Disney characters' efforts to put on the play, than an animated version of Uncle Tom's Cabin. The cartoon contains many images of Mickey and the other characters using makeshift props as sight gags.

The cartoon closes with the characters coming out for a bow, and Horace Horsecollar's character is pelted with rotten tomatoes. When Goofy shows his face from behind the stage, he is hit with a chocolate pie, leaving him in what appears to be blackface, as Goofy laughs making the cartoon to end.

Racial stereotyping

Stereotyped characterizations of black people were then common. Mickey's Mellerdrammer was one of many films and cartoons of its era that referenced Uncle Tom's Cabin, and features Mickey in blackface. Henry Louis Gates Jr. wondered how the cartoon evaded censorship of miscegenation, given that Mickey and Minnie portray Tom and Eva, and are "as they say, an item, and unmistakably so." (Additionally, Mickey is seen cross-dressing in the role of Topsy.)

In the beginning of this short, Clarabelle Cow appears in her dressing room applying lantern soot to her face and leaving an exaggerated area around her lips white. Mickey Mouse then takes a more "comical" approach to applying the makeup: He puts a firecracker in his mouth and lights it, which explodes, causing the ashes to paint his face black while leaving a large area around his lips white.

Reception
Motion Picture Herald reviewed the cartoon on July 1, 1933, saying, "This time Mickey, the inimitable, stages an "Uncle Tom meller", with assorted animated mishaps in the accepted, and approved, Mickey fashion, while the antics of the animated audience contribute not a few of the laughs. It is good cartoon material, and the youngsters, old and young, should enjoy it."

Voice cast
 Mickey Mouse: Walt Disney
 Minnie Mouse: Marcellite Garner
 Horace Horsecollar: Billy Bletcher
 Clarabelle Cow: Elvia Allman
 Goofy: Pinto Colvig

Home media
The short was released on December 7, 2004 on Walt Disney Treasures: Mickey Mouse in Black and White, Volume Two: 1929-1935.

See also
Mickey Mouse (film series)
Uncle Tom's Cabaña
List of entertainers who performed in blackface

References

External links
 

1933 films
1933 animated films
American black-and-white films
Films based on works by Harriet Beecher Stowe
Films directed by Wilfred Jackson
Films produced by Walt Disney
Mickey Mouse short films
Uncle Tom's Cabin
1930s Disney animated short films
Films based on American novels
Blackface minstrel shows and films
Film controversies
Disney controversies
African-American-related controversies in film
Race-related controversies in animation
Race-related controversies in film
Ethnic humour
Cross-dressing in American films
1930s English-language films
1930s American films